Amanita manginiana, also known as Mangin's false death cap, Chiu's false death cap, is a species of the genus Amanita.

Description 
The cap of Amanita manginiana is around 50–80 mm (5–8 cm) wide, chestnut brown, darker in the center, with the margin more pallid, silky (bearing fine hairs), convex then applanate, fleshy, and has a nonstriate margin. The gills are adnate and white. Short gills are present. The stipe is around 50–80 mm (5–8 cm) high, cylindrical, stuffed, white, becoming orangish-brown. The bulb is fleshy, globose to ovoid. The ring is membranous, white, superior, skirt-like. The volva is membranous, limbate, and fulvous-white. The spores measure 7 - 8 × 6 µm and are ovoid to subglobose. Its spores have a length of around  9.2 - 10.3 µm and a width of 7.5 - 7.8 µm. The spores are nothing but amyloid rubble and the collected specimens are unfortunately, almost entirely useless.

This species is very poorly known. Sources state a species similar to A. manginiana from China under the name A. manginiana sensu W.F. Chiu.

Edibility 

Amanita manginiana appears to belong with a group of edible species that at the moment are classed in section Phalloideae though it is not known whether A. manginiana is edible or not.

According to China Forestry Culture Collection Center, it is reported to be edible with potential medical use. However, due to its similarity to other lethal species, consumption are recommended against.

See also 

Amanita
List of Amanita Species

References 

manginiana
Edible fungi
Taxa named by Narcisse Théophile Patouillard